BC Academic Plovdiv is a professional basketball club based in Plovdiv, Bulgaria. The team plays its home games at the Arena SILA.

History
In the 2021–22 season, Academic will play in the FIBA Europe Cup, marking the club's debut in Europe.

European competitions

References

External links
Official website
Eurobasket.com Academic Plovdiv Page

Basketball teams in Bulgaria